The Dhammiyya Shia was a ghulat sect of Islam. The name Dhammiyya was derived from the Arabic word dhamm (i.e. blame). Therefore, the Arabic name Dhammiyya is translated as blamers.

History
The Dhammiyya Shia was one of the sects believed to have been derived from the Saba'iyya (followers of Abdullah Ibn Saba). The sect was also known as the 'Ulyaniyya or 'Alya'iyya, named after ‘Ulyan (or 'Alya) ibn Dhira' as-Sadusi (or ad-Dawsi, or al-Asdi), and appear to have been active around 800 CE.

Beliefs
The Dhammiyya Shia had the following beliefs:
 They believed that Ali was a close friend of Muhammad and should have been the first caliph
 A group of the Dhammiyya believed that both Muhammad and Ali were divine. Therefore, some of them held Muhammad and Ali as equals.
 A group of the Dhammiyya believed that Muhammad, Ali, Fatimah, Hasan ibn Ali and Husayn ibn Ali, who are in one Al-i Aba (overcoat), make up one unity.
 The same one spirit entered all 5 of them at the same time.
 All 5 of them have no superiority over one another.
 Fatima, along with the other 4, is also a male and not a female.

See also
 Islamic schools and branches
 List of extinct Shia sects

Notes

Shia Islamic branches
Ghulat sects